The AA Torque Show was a New Zealand television series about motor vehicles, mainly cars. The half-hour programme was first screened on TV One in 2005 and the second series was shown on Prime Television in April 2007. No other seasons were produced. The show was presented by Roger Walker, Danny Mulheron and Aaron Slight. It was described by binglewootch.com as provocative, humorous and light-hearted in tone.

AA Torque magazine is a publication produced by Fairfax Media which shares some contributors, editors and features with the TV show including contributions by the presenters themselves.

External links
 AA Torque Show home page
 TV One page
 AA Torque magazine
https://www.bingewootch.com/tv/aa-torque/36800

TVNZ 1 original programming
Automotive television series
2005 New Zealand television series debuts